Kate Morton (born 1976) is an Australian author. Morton has sold more than 16 million books in 42 countries, making her one of Australia's "biggest publishing exports". The author has written six novels: The House at Riverton (The Shifting Fog), The Forgotten Garden, The Distant Hours, The Secret Keeper, The Lake House, and The Clockmaker's Daughter (published in September 2018). Her seventh book, Homecoming, will be published in 2023.

Early life and education

Morton is the oldest of three sisters. Her family moved several times before settling on Tamborine Mountain where she attended a small country school. She enjoyed reading books from an early age, her favourites being those by Enid Blyton. 

She completed a Licentiate in Speech and in Drama from Trinity College London and then a summer Shakespeare course at the Royal Academy of Dramatic Art in London. Later she earned first-class honours in English Literature at the University of Queensland (1999) and won a scholarship to complete a master's degree focussing on tragedy in Victorian literature. During her undergraduate studies she wrote two full-length manuscripts (which are unpublished) before writing The House at Riverton (The Shifting Fog), which was published in 2006.

Kate Morton is married to Davin Patterson, a jazz musician and composer. They have three children and live in London.

Bibliography
The House at Riverton (The Shifting Fog): Sunday Times #1 bestseller, New York Times bestseller, Winner - Richard and Judy Best Read of the Year 2007, General Fiction Book of the Year at the 2007 Australian Book Industry Awards, and nominated for Most Popular Book at the British Book Awards in 2008. Sainsbury's Popular Fiction Award Best Novel nominee (2008), Nielsen Gold Book Award 2010, Golden Pan Award UK 1,000,000 copies sold, Indie Next Outstanding Debut Winter 2009.

The Forgotten Garden: New York Times bestseller, Sunday Times #1 bestseller, #1 bestseller Spain, Spiegel bestseller, winner of the ABIA General Fiction Book of the Year (2009), longlisted for the International IMPAC Dublin Literary Award (2010).The Distant Hours:  New York Times bestseller, #1 bestseller Spain, #1 bestseller Ireland Spiegel bestseller, (commended) Christina Stead Award, Fellowship of Australian Writers National Literary Awards (2010).The Secret Keeper: Sunday Times bestseller,  New York Times bestseller, Spiegel bestseller, El País bestseller, winner of the General Fiction Book of the Year, Australian Book Industry Awards (2013), winner of the Christina Stead Award, Fellowship of Australian Writers National Literary Awards (2012), winner of The Courier-Mail People's Choice Queensland Book of the Year (2013).The Lake House: New York Times bestseller,Sunday Times bestseller,  #1 bestseller in Australia, #1 bestseller in Canada, Spiegel bestseller, El País bestseller.

The Clockmaker's Daughter: New York Times bestseller, Sunday Times Bestseller, #1 bestseller in Australia, #1 bestseller Canada.

Homecoming: To be published in 2023.

Novels
2006: The House at Riverton (also known as The Shifting Fog)
2008: The Forgotten Garden 
2010: The Distant Hours 
2012: The Secret Keeper 
2015: The Lake House
2018: The Clockmaker's Daughter
2023: Homecoming

References

External links

 Official website

1976 births
Living people
21st-century Australian novelists
Australian women novelists
University of Queensland alumni
21st-century Australian women writers
Australian emigrants to England